Riot Squad is a 1941 American crime film directed by Edward Finney and starring Richard Cromwell, Rita Quigley and John Miljan.

Synopsis
After his policeman friend is killed by a gang, a doctor agrees to work undercover by joining it.

Cast
 Richard Cromwell as Dr. Tom Brandon
 Rita Quigley as Mary Davis
 John Miljan as Jim Grosso
 Mary Ruth as Betty O'Connor
 Herbert Rawlinson as Police Chief
 Mary Gordon as Mrs. McGonigle
 Donald Kerr as Herbie
 Jack C. Smith as Patrolman Dan O'Connor
 Richard Clarke as Lenny
 Noel Cravat as Little Frankie
 Arthur Space as Butch

References

Bibliography
 Fetrow, Alan G. Feature Films, 1940-1949: a United States Filmography. McFarland, 1994.

External links
 

1941 films
1941 crime films
American crime films
Films directed by Edward Finney
Monogram Pictures films
1940s English-language films
1940s American films